Hazel Wightman and Helen Wills were the defending champions, but did not participate.

Suzanne Lenglen and Elizabeth Ryan defeated Kathleen Bridge and Mary McIlquham in the final, 6–2, 6–2 to win the ladies' doubles tennis title at the 1925 Wimbledon Championships.

Draw

Finals

Top half

Section 1

The nationality of Mrs van Praagh is unknown.

Section 2

Bottom half

Section 3

Section 4

The nationalities of Mrs DC Bousfield and CI Kalber are unknown.

References

External links

Women's Doubles
Wimbledon Championship by year – Women's doubles
Wimbledon Championships - Doubles
Wimbledon Championships - Doubles